İkinci Paşalı (also, Malyye Pashaly, Pashaly Malyye, and Pashaly Vtoryye) is a village in the Hajigabul Rayon of Azerbaijan.  The village forms part of the municipality of Şorbaçı.

References

External Links 

Populated places in Hajigabul District